Symphony in Peril was a Christian metalcore band from Columbus, Ohio, United States. The band started in early 2002, and ended in late 2005, after Hellfest, which the band was to play, but was cancelled at the last minute.

History
Symphony in Peril formed in Columbus, OH in early 2002.  The band gained attention quite early in their development because Shawn Jonas, former vocalist for popular metalcore band Zao, was one of the founding members.

Quickly, they signed with Facedown Records, and released their debut full-length, Lost Memoirs and Faded Pictures, in 2003.  The band toured nationally and internationally with bands such as Nodes of Ranvier and The Chariot and also performed at the Cornerstone and Sonshine festivals.

In March 2005, shortly after releasing their second album, The Whore's Trophy, the band announced that vocalist Shawn Jonas had left the band. In June of the same year, the band announced that John Pope, former singer for fellow Ohio band Narcissus, would be replacing Jonas.

Later that year, in October, the band announced via their MySpace blog that the band would break up after a few final performances in November.

In more recent years, Drummer/Bassist Collin Simula formed a new project titled Maranatha, which was the first band of any of the members from SIP.

In October 2022 the band was active again with a new lineup and released a new single.

Members

Current Members
 Shawn Jonas - vocals (2002–2005, 2022-present)
 Andy Capps - bass (2004–2005) guitar (2022-present)
 Dan Pelletier - guitar (2022-present)
 Josh King - drums (2022-present)
 Chico Weeks - bass (2022-present)

Former
 Collin Simula - drums (2004–2005), bass (2002–2004)
 John Pope - vocals (2005)
 Joshua Hunt - drums (2002)
 Jeremy Hunt - guitar (2002)
 Tim Stephson - bass (2002)
 Shawn Seippel - drums (2002–2004)
 Andy Reale - guitar (2002–2005)
 Joshua Aronovsky - guitar (2002–2005), bass (2002)

Timeline

Discography
EPs
 2-track demo - 2002
Studio albums
 Lost Memoirs and Faded Pictures - Facedown, 2003
 The Whore's Trophy - Facedown, 2005

References

External links
 Symphony in Peril at MySpace
 Symphony in Peril at Last.fm
 YouTube video featuring "Stiletto"

Metalcore musical groups from Ohio
Musical groups established in 2002
Musical groups disestablished in 2005
Heavy metal musical groups from Ohio
Christian hardcore musical groups
2002 establishments in Ohio